Harry Murray was an Australian VC recipient.

Harry Murray may also refer to:
Harry K. Murray, member of the Mississippi Senate
Harry Murray (Emmerdale)
Harry Murray, founder of Ulster Workers' Council
Harry Murray, one half of the comedy duo Murray and Mooney

See also
Henry Murray (disambiguation)
Harold Murray (disambiguation)